William Richardson (1572–1603) was a 16th-century Roman Catholic English martyr.

Richardson was born in the village of Wales, West Riding of Yorkshire. He studied for the Roman Catholic priesthood at seminaries in Valladolid and then Seville, both in Spain. He was ordained sometime between 1594 and 1600. William was then sent back to England, where he used the alias William Anderson. Soon after arriving in England, he was betrayed by a trusted person, arrested in London's Gray's Inn (an Inn of Court), and  imprisoned. He was tried and convicted within a week and hanged, drawn, and quartered. His was the final martyrdom to take place during the reign of Queen Elizabeth I as she was to die herself within a month.

His feast day is celebrated February 27

References

English beatified people
1572 births
1603 deaths
17th-century Roman Catholic martyrs
17th-century venerated Christians
English torture victims
Executed people from South Yorkshire
People from the Metropolitan Borough of Rotherham
16th-century English Roman Catholic priests
17th-century English Roman Catholic priests
People executed under Elizabeth I by hanging, drawing and quartering
One Hundred and Seven Martyrs of England and Wales